There have been two ships of the Royal Navy named HMS Mons after the Battle of Mons:

  was an  launched in 1915 and sold in 1921.
 HMS Mons (1945) was a  laid down in 1945 and cancelled.

References

Royal Navy ship names